Clubland X-Treme Hardcore are a series of compilation albums from Clubland, released by Universal Music TV and AATW, that have been credited as a turning point in UK Hardcore.

Series overview

Clubland X-Treme
 Disc 1
 Scooter – Weekend 4:49 	
 Drunkenmunky – E 2:39 	
 Porn Kings vs. Flip & Fill – Shake Ya Shimmy 3:22 	
 Divine Inspiration – The Way (Put Your Head In My Hand) (Aldrich & Glennon Remix) 3:34 	
 Deja-Vu – Face Down Ass Up 3:44 	
 Dickheadz – Suck My Dick! 4:00 	
 Cisco Kid – Pizzaman 4:12 	
 DJ Aligator Project – Lollipop (X-Rated Mix) 4:12 	
 System, The (3) – If You Leave Me Now (Aldrich & Glennon Remix) 5:24 	
 Sax Brothers, The – Careless Whisper (South East Players Remix) 4:21 	
 Plummet – Damaged (Arctica Remix) 3:55 	
 Head Horny's – My Hero 2:40 	
 Hi-Flyerz – Pumpanola 2:53 	
 Friday Night Posse – Kiss This (Voodoo & Serano Mix) 3:27 	
 Eyeopener – Open Your Eyes (Scott Brown Remix) 3:20 	
 Public Domain – Operation Blade 5:24 	
 Voodoo & Serano – Blood Is Pumpin 4:03 	
 Dallas Superstars – Helium (FNP Remix) 5:17 	
 Special D. – Come With Me (Groove Coverage Remix) 2:59 	

 Disc 2
 Flip & Fill – Field Of Dreams (Q-Tex Mix) 3:38 	
 Voodoo & Serano – Overload (Friday Night Posse Remix) 4:42 	
 Porn Kings – Rock To The Rhythm 4:19 	
 Uproar – The Roof Is On Fire 4:22 	
 Q-Tex – Power Of Love 3:20 	
 N-Trance – Set You Free (Voodoo & Serano Remix) 4:04 	
 Flip & Fill – Shooting Star (Stimulant DJs Remix) 4:12 	
 DJs @ Work – Time To Wonder (Brooklyn Bounce Remix) 3:16 	
 Artemesia – Bits & Pieces 4:01 	
 Starsplash – Wonderful Days 3:30 	
 London Fiesta – Can You Feel It 5:20 	
 Soraya – When You're Gone (Monsoon & Dreamwurx Mix) 3:55 	
 Head Horny's vs. Miguel Serna* – Something Real (Energy Mix) 5:32 	
 Future Breeze – Temple Of Dreams 3:50 	
 Piano Pirates – Make It On My Own 3:42 	
 Jan Wayne – Total Eclipse Of The Heart (Pez Tellett vs Northstarz Remix) 2:49 	
 56K –	Save A Prayer (Steve Murano Remix) 5:20 	
 BK – Revolution 4:48 	
 Slipmatt – Space (Miami Mix) 2:42

Clubland X-Treme 2
 Disc 1
 Special D - Come With Me (Central Seven v Tricky P Remix) 5:30 	
 Chaah – Funkiness Of You (FNP Remix) 4:14 	
 Neo Cortex – Elements (KB Project Remix) 3:55 	
 LMC V U2 – Take Me To The Clouds Above (Lee S Remix) 2:51 	
 Narcotic Thrust – I Like It (Sinewave Surfers 2am Remix) 4:38 	
 Rezidents* – Popcorn (Club Mix) 3:19 	
 Rezonance Q – Sweetheart (FNP Remix) 3:38 	
 Styles & Breeze – You're Shining (Dark Mix) 3:55 	
 Clear Vu – I Adore (CJ Stone Remix) 3:16 	
 Awesome 3 vs. FNP* – Don't Go 4:13 	
 N-Trance – I'm In Heaven (Steve Murano Remix) 3:55 	
 Gladiator (3) Feat Izzy – Now We Are Free (B'Jammin Remix) 3:57 	
 Styles & Breeze Feat Karen Danzig – Heartbeatz (Hixxy Mix) 4:13 	
 Sosumi (2) – Feel The Tribute (Club Mix) 4:09 	
 Big Fish (3) – Somebody Real 4:26 	
 Double Dutch (3) – Bring The Noise (Original Mix) 5:17 	
 Maximum Spell – Tell Me Why 4:23 	
 XTM – Give Me Your Love (KB Project Mix) 3:16 	
 Ultrabeat – Pretty Green Eyes (DJ Lhasa Remix) 4:16
	
 Disc 2
 Scooter – Jigga Jigga! (Flip & Fill Remix) 3:05 	
 Uproar – Brass Disc (KB Project Remix) 3:44 	
 Friday Night Posse – Extreme (Club Mix) 4:15 	
 Flip & Fill Feat Karen Parry – Discoland (Cheeky Trax Remix) 2:37 	
 Superstars Of Bounce – Beat Goes Boom 3:11 	
 Voodoo & Serano – This Is Entertainment (Club Mix) 3:06 	
 Ultrabeat – Feelin' Fine (Scott Brown Remix) 4:22 	
 Plummet – Cherish The Day (Hardknock Remix) 2:50 	
 Tube & Berger – Straight Ahead (Hardcore Remix) 3:55 	
 Royal Gigolos – California Dreamin' (KB Project Mix) 3:42 	
 Jonestown – Sweet Thang (FNP Remix) 3:19 	
 Northstarz Pres. Neon 8 – What's Up 2:52 	
 Kelly Llorenna – This Time I Know Its For Real (KB Project Mix) 3:57 	
 Ron Van Den Beuken – Keep On Movin' (Timeless) (Ratty Remix) 4:08 	
 Tiffany Gayle – Do You Wanna Dance? 3:16 	
 FFD – Ecstasy 3:31 	
 Quango & Zunie – Music Is My Life 4:35 	
 Fatman Scoop Feat Crooklyn Clan, The* – Be Faithful (Kuta Remix) 4:20 	
 Khia – My Neck, My Back (Lick It) (FNP Remix) 4:14

Clubland X-Treme Hardcore

 Disc 1: Mixed by Darren Styles
 Darren Styles Feat. Lisa Abbott - Getting Better
 Dougal & Gammer - Make Some Noise
 System F - Cry (Re-Con Remix)
 Styles & Breeze - You're My Angel (Scott Brown Remix)
 United In Dance Feat. Lisa Marie - Still The One (Re-Con Remix)
 Darren Styles - Drop Zone
 Bimbo Jones - Come Fly With Me (Re-Con Remix)
 Hixxy & Styles - The Theme
 Styles & Breeze - Slide Away
 Flip & Fill Feat. Junior - Pacific Sun (Styles & Breeze Remix)
 Hixxy & UFO - Welcome (05 Mix)
 Darren Styles Feat. Daniel Sherman - Sound Without A Name
 Apollo - Dance (Re-Con Remix)
 Sy & Unknown - Do We Have To Say Goodbye (Styles & Breeze Remix)
 United In Dance Feat. Jenna - Shining Down
 Dark Monks - Insane (Re-Con Remix)
 Impact & Resist - Sunrise (Styles & Breeze Remix)

 Disc 2: Mixed by Breeze
 Dougal & Gammer - X-Treme (Exclusive Clubland Remix)
 Styles & Breeze Feat. Karen Danzig - Heartbeatz (Re-Con Remix)
 Styles & Breeze - Thug Boy
 Neo Cortex - Elements (Styles & Breeze Remix)
 Love Decade - So Real (Styles & Breeze Remix)
 Scott Brown - Neck Breaker (Dougal & Gammer Remix)
 Tina Cousins - Hymn (Gammer & G-Spencer Remix)
 Gammer & G-Spencer - LS Drive
 Re-Con - Right Here Right Now
 Styles & Breeze - The Beat Kicks (Gammer Remix)
 Darren Styles - Cuttin' Deep (VIP)
 Breeze - Let's Fly (Deejaybee & Sketchy Remix)
 Jess & Spenno - Find Your Way (Styles & Breeze Remix)
 The Disco Brothers Feat. Andrea Britton - Time Still Drifts Away (Styles & Breeze Remix)
 Scott Brown & Cat Knight - All About You (Styles & Breeze Remix)
 Lisa Abbott - Blow Me Away (Styles & Breeze Remix)
 Eyeopener - 6 Days (Styles & Breeze Remix)
 Scott Brown & DMO - Fade Away

 Disc 3: Mixed by Hixxy
 Hixxy - Music Is My First Love (Intro)
 N-Trance - Set You Free (Hixxy Remix)
 Special D - Come With Me (Hixxy Remix)
 Visa - Fly Away (Hixxy Remix)
 Yum Yi Feat. Becki Judge - Tantric (Alternative Mix)
 Hixxy & Whizzkid - End Of Time (Hixxy Intro Mix)
 Brooklyn Bounce - Bass, Beats & Melody (Hixxy Remix)
 Ultrabeat - Better Than Life (Hixxy Remix)
 Hixxy - Creatures Of The Night (Dougal & Gammer Remix)
 Praga Khan - Injected With A Poison (Hixxy Remix)
 Yum Yi Feat. Becki Judge - Watching, Waiting
 Hixxy - Rok The Dance Floor (Dub Mix)
 N-Trance - Forever (Hixxy Remix)
 Hixxy Feat. MC Kenetik - Become One
 Ultrabeat - Pretty Green Eyes (Hixxy Remix)
 Styles & Breeze - You're Shining (Hixxy Remix)

Clubland X-Treme Hardcore 2

 Disc 1: Mixed by Darren Styles
 Darren Styles - Jealous
 Ultrabeat & Scott Brown - Elysium (I Go Crazy) (Styles & Breeze Remix)
 Ian Van Dahl - Inspiration (Sy & Unknown Remix)
 Darren Styles Feat. Junior - I Need You
 United In Dance - Rocking With The Best
 Clear Vu - Never Too Late (Re-Con Remix)
 Darren Styles - Save Me
 Re-Con - Pull Over (Re-Edit)
 Sy & Unknown Feat. Lou Lou - U R My Phantasy (Darren Styles Remix)
 Styles & Breeze Feat. Whizzkid - Nightmare
 Dougal & Gammer Feat. Lisa Marie - How Did I Get Here
 Route 1 Feat. Jenny Frost - Crash Landing (Darren Styles Remix)
 Hixxy & Styles Feat. Lou Lou - Happiness
 Trinity - Like The Sun (Sy & Unknown Remix)
 Darren Styles - Skydivin' 06
 Darren Styles & Re-Con - Where Do We Go
 Flip & Fill Feat. Kelly Llorenna - True Love Never Dies (Darren Styles Remix)

 Disc 2: Mixed by Breeze
 Styles & Breeze - You're My Angel (Midnight Mix)
 Scooter - Nessaja (Breeze Remix)
 Styles & Breeze Feat. Karen Danzig - I Will Be (Stevie B Remix)
 Styles & Breeze Feat. MC Storm - Dark Like Vader (Clubland Edit)
 Sy & Unknown Feat. Lou Lou - Believe In Me (Breeze Remix)
 Styles & Breeze - You're Shining (Squad-E Remix)
 Audioscape - Walk Away (Styles & Breeze Remix)
 Re-Con & Squad-E - 1000 Kisses
 Styles & Breeze - Love Garden
 UFO & MC Marley - Connections 06
 Darren Styles Feat. Lisa Abbott - Getting Better (Squad-E Remix)
 Breeze - Hardcore DJ
 Uplift & Euphony Feat. Donna Marie - Inside Your Mind
 Statik - Got A Feeling (Mark Breeze Remix)
 Heaven 7 - This Life (Styles & Breeze Remix)
 Breeze & MC Storm - Jump Jump A Little Higher (Gammer Remix)
 Dougal & Gammer - Know The Score (Clubland Edit)
 Breeze & UFO - Take Your Time (UFO Remix)

 Disc 3: Mixed by Hixxy
 Hixxy Feat. Kate Lesing - More & More
 Porn Kings Vs. Hixxy - Kickin' In The Beat (Hixxy Remix)
 Hixxy & Styles - Elevator
 Whizzkid, Flyin' & Sparky - Free At Last (Hixxy Remix)
 Hixxy & Re-Con - Paradise
 Sy & Unknown - If That's Alright With You (Hixxy Remix)
 Hixxy Feat. Kate Lesing - I Have To Dream (Dougal & Gammer Remix)
 Tatu - All About Us (Hixxy Remix)
 Hixxy - R U Ready (Xtreme Mix)
 Dario G Vs. Hixxy Feat. Ingfrid Straumstøyl - All My Life (Dream To Me)
 Hixxy & MC Storm - Just Accept It (Hixxy 2006 Remix)
 Hixxy & Re-Con - I Can't Wait (Squad-E Remix)
 Hixxy - Final Destination

Clubland X-Treme Hardcore 3

 Disc 1: Mixed by Darren Styles
 Liz Kay - Castles In The Sky (Darren Styles Remix)
 Darren Styles Feat. Wayne G - Lost The Plot
 Wave - Piece Of Heaven (Squad-E Remix)
 United In Dance - Here Come The Drums
 Cascada - Everytime We Touch (Styles & Breeze Remix)
 Darren Styles & Francis Hill - I Say I Love You
 Dougal & Gammer - Nobody Likes The Records
 Darren Styles - Skydivin' (Vocal Mix)
 Déjà Vu - Face Down Ass Up (Darren Styles Remix)
 Hyperlogic - Only You (Re-Con Remix)
 Darren Styles - Save Me (Re-Con Remix)
 Sy & Unknown Feat. Lou Lou - Be With You
 Styles & Re-Con - Sure Feels Good (Hardcore Mix)
 Styles & Breeze - Do You Want Me Honey
 Vince Nysse & N J Hinton Feat. Pascale - Silver Water (Darren Styles Remix)
 United In Dance - Boom Daka
 Metro - Make This Happen

 Disc 2: Mixed by Breeze
 MC Storm Flyin' & Sparky - All About
 D-Code feat. Emma - My Direction (Squad-E Xtreme Edit)
 Breeze - Hardcore DJ (Re-Con Remix)
 Liz Kay - When Love Becomes A Lie (Breeze Remix)
 Breeze & Re-Con - Only If
 Cascada - Truly Madly Deeply (Styles & Breeze Remix)
 Breeze & Euphony Feat. Donna Marie - Never Be Alone
 Bodyrox - Yeah Yeah (Dougal & Gammer 'The Beats The Bass' Remix)
 Ramos Supreme & Sunset Regime - Gotta Believe (Re-Con Remix)
 Breeze Vs. Lost Witness - Rise Again
 SHM & Scottie B - Crash
 Breeze & UFO - Dirty
 Sy & Unknown Feat. Lou Lou - Touch The Sky
 Breeze & Re-Con - Love You For A Lifetime
 Sublime - Walking In The Rain (Styles & Breeze Remix)
 Styles & Breeze - Come On
 Re-Con & Squad-E - Good To Me
 Infextious - Let Me Fly (Jamie Ritmen Remix)

 Disc 3: Mixed by Hixxy
 Squad-E & Chris Henry - Untouchable (Hixxy & Squad-E Remix)
 Hixxy - Take Me With You
 Hixxy, Sy & Unknown - Freaks
 Voodoo & Serano - Overload (Hixxy & Re-Con Remix)
 Hixxy & Squad-E - Beat Drop
 Hixxy - More & More (Sy & Unknown Remix)
 Hixxy & Re-Con - Come Alive
 Hixxy & Dougal & Gammer - Hot Looking Babes
 Anti-Social - Forever Young (Hixxy Remix)
 Hixxy, Sy & Unknown - First Time Meet Up
 Hixxy & Re-Con - Power Of Love
 Hixxy & Re-Con - Get Hard
 Hixxy & Euphony Feat. Donna Marie - Night Life (Hixxy Remix)
 Hixxy, Dougal & Gammer Feat. MC Storm - I'm Hardcore, This Is What I Do
 Hixxy - Sacrifice

Clubland X-Treme Hardcore 4

 Disc 1: Mixed by Darren Styles
 Intro
 Darren Styles & Francis Hill - Come Running
 Dougal & Gammer - Don't Stop Go
 Darren Styles & Squad-E - Baby I'll Let You Know
 Re-Con - Beating Of The Drum (Can You Feel It)
 Nalin & Kane feat. Alex Prince - Cruising (Beachball 06) (Darren Styles Remix)
 Hypasonic Vs. Jorg Schmidt - Doesn't Matter (Squad-E Remix)
 Darren Styles & Whizzkid - Girlfriend
 Gammer - Rippin'
 Darren Styles Feat. Andrea Britton - Show Me The Sunshine
 Sy & Unknown feat. Lou Lou - Hands Of Time
 Darren Styles & Squad-E - Party People
 D:Code Feat. Emma - Like I Feel (Squad-E Remix)
 Ultrabeat Vs. Darren Styles - Paradise & Dreams (Re-Con Remix)
 Darren Styles - Jealous (Specialist Sound Remix)
 Dougal & Gammer - Wii Go Crazy
 Darren Styles Feat. Junior - I Need You (Sy & Unknown Remix)
 Darren Styles & Francis Hill - Light Of My Life
 Sy & Unknown Feat. Emily Reed - Love For Life

 Disc 2: Mixed by Breeze
 SHM - You And Me (Breeze Remix)
 Paradise - See The Light (Styles & Breeze Remix)
 Micky Modelle Feat. Jessy - Dancing In The Dark (Breeze & UFO Remix)
 Breeze Vs. Lost Witness - Rise Again (Sy & Unknown Remix)
 Manian Feat. Aila - Heaven (Breeze Remix)
 Re-Con - Save The Rave
 M&C Feat. Rebecca Rudd - Magic Touch (Squad-E Remix)
 Breeze Vs. Unique - Sometimes
 Styles & Breeze - Electric (Specialist Sound Remix)
 Katie Jewels - Burning Love (Breeze Remix)
 GSDX Feat. Amiee - The Dream (Breeze Remix)
 DJ Demand - Dark & Light (Re-Con Remix)
 Styles & Breeze - Come With Me (Unique Remix)
 Breeze & Ritmen - If I Were You
 Breeze & UFO Feat. Vikki Fee - Maybe
 Breeze & Ritmen - Don't Go Away
 Styles & Breeze - Do You Want Me Honey (Force & Ritmen Xtreme Remix)
 Breeze & UFO - Filthy

 Disc 3: Mixed  by Hixxy
 Hixxy Feat. Taya - Take Me To Heaven
 Hixxy, Dougal & Gammer - Phaze 2 Phaze
 Frisco - Sea Of Love (Hixxy Remix)
 Hixxy & Re-Con - Need Your Loving
 Hixxy - Time Comes (Sy & Unknown Remix)
 Starstylerz Feat. Michy - Keep On Movin (Hixxy Remix)
 Hixxy, Sy & Unknown - Be The One
 Hixxy - New Day
 Hixxy & Re-Con - Dance With Me
 Hixxy, Dougal & Gammer - Dark Skies
 Hixxy - Perfect World
 Hixxy, Sy & Unknown - The 'Clit' Commander
 Hixxy & Re-Con - Love Comes Version 1.1
 Hixxy Feat. L.O.L - Love Leaves No Scar
 Hixxy & MC Storm - Jump & Pump
 Ultrabeat Vs. Darren Styles - Sure Feels Good (Hixxy, Sy & Unknown Remix)

Clubland X-Treme Hardcore 5

 Disc 1: Mixed by Darren Styles
 Ultrabeat Vs. Darren Styles - Discolights (Hardcore Mix)
 Styles & Breeze - Amigos (Hardcore Mix)
 Manian - Turn The Tide (Darren Styles Remix)
 Darren Styles - Sorry
 DJ Fear - First Serve (Dougal & Gammer Remix)
 Al Storm & Euphony Feat. Donna Marie - All I Wanna Do (Darren Styles Remix)
 Fragma - Toca's Miracle '08 (Darren Styles Remix)
 Re-Con & Squad-E - Cut & Recycle
 Manian - Welcome To The Club (Darren Styles Remix)
 Darren Styles Feat. Justine - Tell Me (Re-Con Remix)
 Al Storm Feat Malaya - It's Over (DS Mix)
 Re-Con & Squad-E - Why Does My Heart
 United In Dance - The Horns Of Jericho (Dougal & Gammer Remix)
 Azura - The Heartache
 United In Dance - 1,2,3,4
 Re-Con & Chris Unknown - Please Tell Me
 Jamie Ritman - Touch The Sun (Darren Styles Remix)
 Darren Styles - Flashlight

 Disc 2: Mixed by Breeze
 Breeze Vs. Barley Feat. Taya - Falling
 Cascada - Because The Night (Breeze & Unknown Remix)
 E-Type - True Believer (Styles & Breeze Remix)
 Sugababes - About You Now (Breeze & Unknown Remix)
 BassFreakerz - Cry For You (Darren Styles Remix)
 Mickey Modelle - Take Me Away (Breeze & UFO Remix)
 Styles & Breeze - Weekend Has Come
 Breeze & Ufo - X-Rated
 Rob Mayth - Heart 2 Heart (Breeze & Ritmen Remix)
 Breeze & Styles - Futureset '08
 Darwin & In Effect Feat. Fraz - Only Road (Breeze Remix)
 Breeze & Chris Unknown - Don't Walk Away
 Azura - Tell You A Secret (Breeze Remix)
 Jamie Ritmen - Bassphaze
 Club Generation - Every Heartbeat
 Breeze Vs. Brad Shure Feat. Katie Halliday - Summer Rain
 Barley Feat Taya - Feeling So Alive
 Styles, Breeze & Re-Con - Love Sick Crazy
 Breeze & Chris Unknown - One Desire

 Disc 3: Mixed by Hixxy
 Hixxy - Deep In The Night (Clubland Intro Mix)
 Hixxy & Re-con - The Way
 Hixxy - No 1.
 United in Dance - Do It Like This
 Hixxy - Face In The Crowd
 Hixxy - Brother (My Guiding Light)
 The Real Booty Babes - Played Alive (Darren Styles Remix)
 Hixxy - Now That I Found You
 Paul EP & Smithy - Walk on Water (Hixxy Remix)
 Hixxy & Chris Unknown - Get Up Get On Your Feet 1,2,3
 Hixxy - There When You Fall
 The Real Booty Babes - I Kissed A Girl (Dougal & Gammer Remix)
 Hixxy & Technikore - MDMA
 LOL - Love Leaves No Scar (Hixxy Remix)
 Ultrabeat - Never Ever (Chris Unknown Remix)
 Hixxy - The Game, Zaboocan
 Hixxy & Chris Unknown - Solitary Rush
 Hixxy & MC Storm - Living in a Dream
 Technikore Feat. Nathalie - Calling Out For You

Clubland X-Treme Hardcore 6

 Disc 1: Mixed by Darren Styles
 Intro
 Darren Styles & Manian - Outta My Head
 Dougal & Gammer - Models Are Ugly
 John 0'Callaghan - Find Yourself (Darren Styles Remix)
 Chris Fear - Rock `n' Roller
 Cascada - Everytime I Hear Your Name (Dougal & Gammer Remix)
 Re-Con - Fuel To Fire
 Dougal & Gammer - Anybody Else But You
 Darren Styles - Bassline Road
 Tom Parr - Missing You (Gammer Remix)
 DJ Gollum - Passenger (Hardcore Mix)
 Styles & Breeze - Electric 2010
 Odyssey, Modulate & Petruccio - Stairway To Heaven
 Darren Styles & Chris Unknown feat Molly - Shining Star
 Re-Con - Kidz
 Darren Styles - Do You Feel The Same
 Technikore Feat Nat - Runaway (Breeze Remix)
 JB-C - Rock 1 Time
 Sy & Unknown - Move It
 Kirsten Joy - Only Your Love (Chris Unknown & Re-Con)

 Disc 2: Mixed by Breeze
 MC Whizzkid - The Ringmaster (Intro)
 Ultrabeat - Use Somebody (Chris Unknown Remix)
 Styles & Breeze - Sonic 2010
 Breeze & Beat Commanders Feat. MOB - Party Vibe
 Breeze & Re-Con - Twist
 Master Blaster - Everywhere (Breeze & UFO Remix)
 Keira Green - All Outta Love (Azora Remix)
 Breeze & UFO - Hardcore Orchestra
 Frisco & Alexia - Me and You (Breeze Remix)
 Kaskade & Deadmau5 - Move For Me (Dougal & Gammer Remix)
 Beat Commanders - Make You Mine (Supreme, UFO & MOB Remix)
 Dougal & Gammer - Boing!
 Scooter - Lonely (Breeze & Ritmen Remix)
 Re-Con - Torn Apart
 Italo Brothers - Stamp On The Ground (Breeze Remix)
 Dougal & Gammer - Break It
 Breeze & UFO Vs. Lost Witness - Love To The Stars
 Sy & Unknown - Electronic VIP
 Breeze & Unique - Reach Out
 Styles & Breeze Feat Karen Danzig - Heartbeatz (Specialist Sound Remix)

 Disc 3: Mixed by Hixxy
 Dougal & Gammer Feat. DWB - Shine Your Light
 Al Storm Feat. Amy - Surrender (Clubland Mix)
 Ramos, Punch & Protocol feat  - Summer Love (Hixxy Remix)
 AudioJunkie & Stylus - Taken Over Me
 Hixxy & Technikore - Now You Got Me
 Re-Con - Without Doubt
 Hixxy & Sy - Dum, Der Did It Dit It
 Al Storm & Euphony ft. Danielle - Turn Around 2009/ 10
 Dougal & Gammer - Boom Ba De
 Hixxy - Million Miles
 Sy & Unknown Feat. Emily Reed - Digital Lover (Re-Con Remix)
 Hixxy - Kaleidoscope
 Re-Con - Walking Time Bomb
 JB-C - Clubwalker
 MC Storm - H>A>R>D C.O.R.E.
 Hixxy & Technikore - Re-loaded
 Cadence - I Surrender (Hixxy Hardcore Remix)
 D:Code - Make You Love Me (Squad-E Remix)

Clubland X-Treme Hardcore 7

 Disc 1: Mixed by Darren Styles
 The Entity - Wisdom
 Darren Styles & Francis Hill Feat. Lucy - Here Tonight
 Dougal, Gammer & Chris Fear - Supersonic
 Darren Styles - Holding On
 Double Dutch - Bring The Noise (Darren Styles Remix)
 Gammer - Major Panic (Have It Back)
 Darren Styles Feat. Tyler - Open Your Eyes
 Danny Byrd - We Can Have It All (Re-Con Remix)
 Gammer & Whizzkid - Could Be Real
 Darren Styles - Raining Down
 Dougal, Gammer & JB-C - Tape Machine
 Darren Styles - Getting Better (Gammer Update)
 Styles & Re-Con - Take You Down
 Re-Con & Gammer - Get It Right
 Klubfiller Feat. Kyla - On A Cloud
 Darren Styles & Chris Unknown - Reload
 Rudedog - Walk Into The Sun (Darren Styles Remix)
 Slammer & Auscore - The Way (Darren Styles Remix)
 Sy & Unknown - Walking On Air
 Plasticman - Blackout
 Dougal & Gammer Feat. Jerome - Domination

 Disc 2: Mixed by Breeze
 Flip & Fill - I Need Air (Breeze & Chris Unknown Remix)
 Styles & Breeze - Your Shining (Petruccio & Modulate Remix)
 Duck Sauce - Barbra Streisand (MOB Remix)
 Styles & Breeze - Into Your Eyes
 Inna - 10 Minutes (Breeze & Klubfiller Remix)
 Breeze & Mob - Is It Too Late
 Dakota Ray - Feels So Good (Breeze & Chris Unknown Remix)
 Breeze & Styles - Thugboy (Flyin & Sparky Remix)
 Petruccio & Modulate Feat. Marie Louise - F@%k It Up!
 Styles & Breeze Feat. Karen Danzig - Heartbeatz (Supreme & Mob Remix)
 Breeze & Klubfiller - Are You Ready?
 Stylus & AudioJunkie Feat. Whizzkid - Bassline Criminal
 Michael Scout Feat. Ste McNally - All This I Know
 Breeze & Ritmen - Get A Fuckin' Life
 Eufeion - SAW
 Breeze - 1 2 3 Hit It!
 Breeze & Kevin Energy - The Pendulum Of Bass
 Micky Modelle v Breeze Feat. Stunt - I'm Alive
 Breeze & Chris Unknown - Kick Your Legs
 Breeze & UFO - Dirty (2010)
 GSDX Feat. Scandal - Lose This Feeling (Breeze Remix)

 Disc 3: Mixed by Hixxy
 Squad-E & MC Storm - Hardcore Syco (Exclusive X-Treme Mix)
 Hixxy - Don't Feel Like Love
 Dougal & Gammer - Hard As Fuck
 R.I.O - Shine On (Hixxy Remix)
 Ramos, Supreme & Mob - Catch You (Re-Con Remix)
 Hixxy & Chris Unknown - This Is How We Roll
 Klubfiller - Break Of Day
 Hixxy & Technikore Feat. Intraspekt - Don't Need
 Anti-Social - My Way (Re-Con Remix)
 Sy & Unknown Feat. JT - Love Song
 Hixxy - Feel It In The Air (Gammer Remix)
 Al Storm - Werewolf
 Klubfiller - Get The Funk (KF Hardcore Edit)
 Hixxy - I Wanna Play Your Game
 Hixxy & Technikore - Home Alone
 Supreme & MOB Feat. JJ - I Hate You 2010
 Hixxy & Chris Unknown - Konfusion
 Hixxy, Ramos & Punch - You're Gonna Love Me
 Hixxy & Re-Con - Crazy Underground
 Al Storm - Mad House

 Disc 4: Best of Clubland X-Treme Hardcore
 Ultrabeat & Scott Brown - Elysium (Styles & Breeze Remix)
 Darren Styles - Save Me
 Scooter - Nessaja (Breeze Remix)
 Hixxy Feat. Kate Lesing - More & More
 Love Decade - So Real (Styles & Breeze Remix)
 Apollo - Dance (Re-Con Remix)
 Hypasonic Vs. Jorg Schmid - Doesn't Matter (Squad-E Remix)
 Breeze Vs. Lost Witness - Rise Again
 Special D - Come With Me (Hixxy Remix)
 N-Trance - Set You Free (Hixxy Remix)
 Scott Brown & Cat Knight - All About You (Styles & Breeze Remix)
 Bimbo Jones - Come Fly With Me (Re-Con Remix)
 Re-con - Pull Over
 Ultrabeat Vs. Darren Styles - Sure Feels Good (Hardcore Mix)
 Dougal & Gammer - Make Some Noise
 Sy & Unknown Feat. Lou Lou - U R My Phantasy (Darren Styles Remix)
 Styles & Breeze - Slide Away

Clubland X-Treme Hardcore 8

 Disc 1: Mixed by Darren Styles
 Darren Styles & Gammer - You & I
 Herd & Fitz Feat. Abigail Bailey - I Just Can't Get Enough (Re-Con & Squad-E Remix)
 Gammer & Whizzkid - We Killed The Rave
 Darren Styles - Satellite
 Eclipse - 24/7 (Styles & Breeze 2011 Remix)
 Modulate - What You Got
 Benny Benassi Feat. Gary Go - Cinema (Styles & Modulate Remix)
 N-Force Vs. Darren Styles - Right By Your Side (Gammer Remix)
 Oxygen Feat. Andrea Britton - Am I On Your Mind? (Styles & Re-Con Remix)
 Darren Styles - Screwface
 Black & White - Get Your Hands Up (Darren Styles Remix)
 Darren Styles - Mercy
 Darren Styles, Prospect & Becci - Lose Yourself
 Apollo - Dance (Darren Styles Remix)
 Modulate Feat. Jay Jacob - 3
 Darren Styles Feat. Tyler - Open Your Eyes (Petruccio & Modulate Remix)
 Darren Styles - Bonfire
 Styles, Breeze, Petruccio & Modulate - Rock The Club
 Sy & Unknown Feat. Kirsten Joy - Bright Like The Sun

 Disc 2: Mixed by Breeze
 Sosumi Feat. Misy DJ - You Got The Love (Breeze & Modulate Remix)
 Breeze & Modulate - Bang 2 Me Nasty (VIP Mix)
 Modulate ft. Marie Louise - 2 Lift Me Up
 Breeze & Modulate - Inside Out (Hardcore Mix)
 Styles, Breeze & Klubfiller - See The Stars
 Ham - Anything For You
 Organ Donors - Make The Girlies Wet (Breeze & Modulate Hardcore Remix)
 Petruccio & Modulate Feat. Marie Louise - Missing
 Petruccio & Modulate Feat. MC Whizzkid - Tsunami
 Breeze & Modulate Feat. Marie Louise - Wait Up!
 Stylus & Audiojunkie - Synth Mode
 Styles & Breeze - Crack It Smack It
 Petruccio & Modulate Feat. Mark Slammer - High On You
 Darren Styles, Prospect & Becci - Driving Me Crazy
 Petruccio & Modulate - Skank In The House
 Destiny - Today
 Modulate Feat. MC Static - Maniac
 Major Players - Come With Me (Petruccio Remix)
 Sy & Unknown - You Got Me Rockin'
 Adam Harris - For A Lifetime (Breeze Remix)

 Disc 3: Mixed by Re-Con and Hixxy
 Re-Con & Demand - Heart Bleeds
 Re-Con & MC Storm - Hardcore Bones
 Re-con & Demand - Something's Gotta Hold On Me
 Klubfiller - Feel Alive
 Re-Con - Calling
 Hixxy, Dave Castellano & Fat Steve - Falling From The Sky
 Blood Red - Show Me The Way (Re-Con Vs. Blood Red Re Hash)
 Hixxy - Outside World
 Re-Con & Demand - I'm Sorry
 Defiant DJs - Levels
 Hixxy - Rock The World
 Re-Con & Klubfiller - Good For Me
 Hixxy - Sora Blue
 Klubfiller - Sunshine Way
 Sy & Technikore - Crash The Party
 Hixxy - I'm Hardcore Till I Die
 Re-Con - WTF
 Hixxy & M.O.B - Touch Myself
 Hixxy, Ramos, Protocol & Dubzie - Open Your Eyes

Clubland X-Treme Hardcore 9

 Disc 1: Mixed by Darren Styles
 Darren Styles Feat. Molly - Never Forget You
 Dougal & Gammer - Fuck That Shit
 Ayah Marar - Unstoppable (Metrik Remix)
 Gareth Emery Feat. Christina Novelli - Concrete Angel (Darren Styles & Chris Unknown Remix)
 Matrix & Futurebound - Magnetic Eyes (Darren Styles & Modulate Remix)
 Steampunk - Loki's Theme (Re-Con Remix)
 Darren Styles - Save Me (Modulate Drumstep Remix)
 Dougal & Gammer Feat. Hannah Faulkner - The One
 Darren Styles & Michael Scout Feat. Ste McNally - Forever
 Re-Con - Gyroscope
 Darren Styles & Re-Con - Sober
 Darren Styles & Gammer/John O' Callaghan - Paranoia (Original Mix)/Find Yourself (Darren Styles Remix)
 Ayah Marar - The Raver (Darren Styles Remix)
 Gammer & Klubfiller - Late Night
 Tyler Feat. Static - Fight
 Darren Styles & Dougal - Don't Give Up
 Dougal & Gammer - Don't Leave Me
 Steampunk - Forever Loved (Re-Con Remix)
 Gammer & Michael Scout - Bye Bye

 Disc 2: Mixed by Breeze
 Modulate Feat. MC Whizzkid - Bitch Slap
 T2Kazuya - Youth
 Petruccio & Modulate Feat. Marie Louise - Escape
 Modulate - Dagger
 MOB & Becci - Taking Me Over
 Modulate Feat. Marie Louise - Body Scream
 Nero - Won't You Be There (Baauer Remix)
 Chase & Status Feat. Liam Bailey - Blind Faith (Loadstar Remix)
 Fleur & Cutline - Broken Mirror (Metrik Remix)
 Modulate Feat. MC Static - May Day
 Breeze & Petruccio - Inception
 Rocket Pimp - Grim Reaper (Skeets Remix)
 The Prototypes - Suffocate
 Jayline - Do You Like Jungle (Breeze VIP)
 Tantrum Desire Feat. I-KAY - What Is Your Desire
 Breeze & Modulate - Don't Hold Back
 Breeze & Modulate Feat. Angie Brown - So Good
 Modulate - Moving
 Tyl3r & Reynolds - Break Out
 JENN D - Lose It (Loadstar Remix)
 Breeze & Chris Unknown - R3tro
 Breeze & Modulate - You Got It All
 Magikstar - Calling (Modulate VIP Mix)

 Disc 3, Part 1: Mixed by Hixxy
 Ultrabeat - Rain Stops (Re-Con Vs. Blood Red Remix)
 Da Tweekaz Feat. Oscar - Break The Spell (Hixxy Remix)
 Chris Unknown - Hardcore Mother Fucker
 Hixxy - Deep In The Night (2013 VIP)
 Klubfiller - Coming Home
 Hixxy - Turniup
 Klubfiller & MC Storm - F.T.I.D
 Hixxy - Ano Hi Yume
 Mob, Ramos & Protocol - Forget Her Name (Hixxy Remix)
 Ian Van Dahl - Inspiration (Chris Unknown Remix)
 Hixxy Vs. Lucy Westhead - Don't Let Me Know
 Hixxy & Re-Con - Power Of Love (2013 VIP)

 Disc 3, Part 2: Mixed by Gammer
 Dougal & Gammer Feat. Hannah Faulkner - Knight In Shining Armour
 Benny Benassi Feat. Gary Go - Cinema (Skrillex Remix) (Gammer Dubcore Edit)
 Gammer - Nostalgia
 Re-Con & Demand - I'm Sorry (Gammer & Klubfiller Remix)
 Darren Styles/Dougal & Gammer - Xfer/Anybody Else But You (Acapella)
 Matt Lee - Wait A Second (170 Mix)
 Dougal & Gammer - Mix Your Sex
 Clear Vu - Never 2 Late (Gammer Remix)
 Nero - Promises (Skrillex & Nero Remix) (Gammer Dubcore Edit)
 Gammer/Ultrabeat & Darren Styles - Good Life (Bad Day)/Sure Feels Good
 U Mad/Darren Styles - Ian? (Icarus Remix)/Getting Better (Acapella)
 Dougal & Gammer - Dibi Dibi Sound
 Stylus & AudioJunkie - Rope Burn
 Gomurpls/Dougal & Gammer Feat. Niki Mak - Aerodynamic/Everytime I Hear Your Name
 Ruffage - Paradise (Gammer 'Parakick' Remix)
 Petruccio & Modulate Feat. Marie Louise - Missing (Gammer Remix)
 Gammer & Klubfiller - Closer
 Scott Brown/Paradise - Elysium/See The Light (Acapella)
 Celldweller/Gammer & Whizzkid - Tough Guy/Scream
 Darren Styles - Save Me (Gammer's Super Awesome Ballad Version That Goes Down Well Everywhere In The World)
 Gammer & Whizzkid - We Killed The Rave (Best Hardcore Track Of The Year Edition)

See also
 Bonkers (compilation album series)
 Clubland (compilation series)
 Clubland (dance brand)

References

External links
 
 
 
 

Clubland (dance brand) albums
Electronic compilation albums
2000s compilation albums